Lote Raikabula (born 31 July 1983 in Suva, Fiji) is a New Zealand rugby player who has played both rugby union and rugby sevens. He currently plays for the All Blacks Sevens team in the IRB Sevens World Series & is the Rugby coach for Trinity College, Kandy. He has played more than 60 tournaments since his debut in 2006, playing in 20 tournament-winning teams. he has five IRB Sevens World Series medals, a Rugby World Cup Sevens title and two Commonwealth Games gold medals.

Raikabula has played rugby union for both Hawkes Bay and Manawatu in the Air New Zealand Cup.

Raikabula has won five IRB Sevens World Series medals, a Rugby World Cup Sevens title, and two Commonwealth Games gold medals.

He played ten years for the New Zealand sevens team from 2006 - 2016, retiring from international rugby shortly before the 2016 Rio Summer Olympics, at the age of 33.

Coaching
In November 2016 he was appointed as the head coach of Rugby at Trinity College Kandy, Sri Lanka. His services as the head coach of Rugby at Trinity College was discontinued effective from 2 June 2018.

He is currently Head Coach of the Thailand Men's and Women’s 7s Team along with being Director of Rugby for the union

Career highlights
 New Zealand Sevens 2006 - 2016
 Hawke's Bay 2006, 2007
 East Coast 2005
 Wellington Sevens 2002–2005
 Wellington Under 21 2003

References

1983 births
New Zealand rugby union players
New Zealand people of I-Taukei Fijian descent
Rugby sevens players at the 2006 Commonwealth Games
Commonwealth Games gold medallists for New Zealand
Fijian emigrants to New Zealand
Living people
New Zealand international rugby sevens players
Commonwealth Games rugby sevens players of New Zealand
Rugby sevens players at the 2010 Commonwealth Games
Commonwealth Games medallists in rugby sevens
Commonwealth Games rugby sevens players of Fiji
Medallists at the 2006 Commonwealth Games
Medallists at the 2010 Commonwealth Games